Seeing is a concerto for solo piano and orchestra by the American composer Christopher Rouse.  The work was commissioned by the New York Philharmonic for the pianist Emanuel Ax, with financial contributions from philanthropists Lillian and Maurice Barbash.  It was premiered at Avery Fisher Hall in New York City May 6, 1999, with Leonard Slatkin conducting Emanuel Ax and the New York Philharmonic.  The piece is dedicated to Emanuel Ax.

Composition
The piece has a duration of roughly 28 minutes and is composed in four connected sections, similar to the form of a traditional concerto.

Style and influences
The composition freely quotes passages from Robert Schumann's Piano Concerto.  Rouse wrote of this in the score program notes:
The title of the piece comes from the song "Seeing" in the Moby Grape album Moby Grape '69.  Rouse saw the album while browsing through his collection of rock music and "was struck by the combination of simplicity and vision symbolized by this title."  Rouse used this to extrapolate the conception of the work, later writing:
As to whether the piece has any programmatic intent, Rouse specified:

Instrumentation
Seeing is scored for solo piano and an orchestra comprising three flutes, three oboes (3rd doubling English horn), three clarinets (3rd doubling bass clarinet), three bassoons, four French horns, three trumpets, three trombones, tuba, celesta, timpani, three percussionists, and strings.

Reception
Reviewing the world premiere, Allan Kozinn of The New York Times called the work "a colorful, thorny, eclectic imagining of psychosis" and wrote:
Tim Page of The Washington Post similarly praised Seeing as "a work of dark, brooding fancy."  He further remarked, "It is a substantial piece but not at all comfortable to listen to: One struggles through passages of furious and magnificent noise, to be rewarded, on occasion, with moments of serene and gossamer beauty, appreciating them all the more for their scarcity."  Matthew Rye of The Daily Telegraph called the piece an "intriguing, if bizarre new work."
Keith Potter of The Independent was much more critical, however, writing:

References

Concertos by Christopher Rouse
1998 compositions
Piano concertos
Music commissioned by the New York Philharmonic